Delese Mimi Darko is a Ghanaian pharmacist. In 2017, she became the first woman to be appointed chief executive officer of the Ghana Food and Drugs Authority by Nana Akuffo-Addo.

Education 
She attended Achimota School in Accra. In 1991, Darko graduated from the Kwame Nkrumah University of Science and Technology, where she was trained as a pharmacist. She later obtained a master's degree in business administration from the University of Northampton.

Career 
Darko joined the Food and Drugs Board in the early 1990s. The organisation was subsequently renamed the Food and Drugs Authority (FDA), and Darko has served there in various capacities. She has worked in every department of the institution, starting from the laboratory. She also helped in the setting up of two technical advisory committees to assist the board in their work. She was the designer of the current logo of the FDA. Darko was the lead for a collaboration between the FDA and the UK-MHRA in the area of medicine safety, which is now multi-divisional at the FDA with anti-counterfeiting as one of the key areas of support. Prior to her appointment as the chief executive officer, she was the head of Safety, Monitoring and Clinical Trial Division.

In 2020, under Darko's leadership, the FDA was recognised as a World Health Organisation Level Three listed institution.

Other activities 
Since its inception in 2017, Darko has been a member the Scientific Advisory Group of the WHO R&D Blueprint, a global strategy and preparedness plan that allows the rapid activation of research activities during epidemics, chaired by Jeremy Farrar. Other international and local advisory committees she serves on include: 
 Coalition for Epidemic Preparedness Innovations, Member of the Scientific Advisory Board
 Council for International Organizations of Medical Sciences, Member of the Working Group on Vaccine Safety
 African Regulators’ Network, Member
 African Vaccines Regulatory Forum, Chair of the Technical Coordinating Committee
 Rural Outreach and Aid Mission, Member of the Board of Trustees

Recognition 
In 2018 Darko was nominated for the United Nations Interagency Task Force on the Prevention and Control of NCDs Awards.

In 2019, Darko was awarded the GliTZ Africa award for Ghana Women of the Year Honours for excellence in health. She was also given a special recognition award at the 13th Gong-gong Awards.

References

Living people
Ghanaian pharmacists
Kwame Nkrumah University of Science and Technology alumni
Year of birth missing (living people)